Maret Maripuu (born 16 July 1974 in Tallinn) is an Estonian politician, a member of the Reform Party.

From April 2007 until February 2009 she served as Minister of Social Affairs. Previously, she was a member of the Riigikogu from 1999 to 2007, and was Vice President of the Riigikogu from 2006 to 2007. She was also on the Tallinn City Council from 1999 to 2005, and was the chairman of the council from 2001 to 2005.

References

1974 births
Living people
Government ministers of Estonia
Members of the Riigikogu, 1999–2003
Members of the Riigikogu, 2003–2007
Members of the Riigikogu, 2007–2011
Members of the Riigikogu, 2011–2015
Estonian Reform Party politicians
Libertarianism in Europe
Politicians from Tallinn
21st-century Estonian politicians
21st-century Estonian women politicians
Women members of the Riigikogu
Women government ministers of Estonia